The Queen Elizabeth Range is a rugged mountain range of the Transantarctic Mountains System, located in the Ross Dependency region of Antarctica.

Mount Markham (4,350 m), is the highest elevation in the range.

Named by J.H. Miller of the New Zealand party of the Commonwealth Trans-Antarctic Expedition (1956–58) who, with G.W. Marsh, explored this area. It was named for Queen Elizabeth II, the patron of the expedition.

Geological features

Mount Bonaparte 
Discovered by the British Antarctic Expedition (1907–09) under Shackleton, and named for Prince Roland Bonaparte, President of the Société de Géographie of Paris from 1910-1924.

Inaccessible Cliffs 
Inaccessible Cliffs is a line of steep cliffs, interrupted by several glaciers, which form the northern escarpment of the range. The escarpment borders the southern side of the Nimrod Glacier which is very heavily crevassed. Named by the northern party of the New Zealand Geological Survey Antarctic Expedition (NZGSAE) (1961–62) because of their general inaccessibility.

Mount Lecointe 
Named by the British Antarctic Expedition (1907–09) for Lt. Georges Lecointe, who was second in command of the Belgian Antarctic Expedition (1897–99) under Adrien de Gerlache.

Mount Predoehl 
Mapped by the United States Geological Survey (USGS) from Tellurometer surveys and Navy air photos, 1960-62. Named by Advisory Committee on Antarctic Names (US-ACAN) for Martin C. Predoehl, United States Antarctic Research Program (USARP) meteorologist at McMurdo Station, 1961–62 and 1962-63.

Mount Rabot 
Mount Rabot is a mountain, 3,335 m, standing  SE of Mount Lecointe. Discovered and named by the British Antarctic Expedition (1907–09). Charles Rabot was editor of La Geographie, bulletin of the Societe Geographique, Paris, and was an outstanding glaciologist of that period.

Prince Andrew Plateau 
Prince Andrew Plateau is an ice-covered plateau, about 40 nautical miles (70 km) long and 15 nautical miles (28 km) wide, lying south of Mount Rabot. Named by the New Zealand Geological Survey Antarctic Expedition (NZGSAE) (1961–62) for Prince Andrew, Duke of York, son of Queen Elizabeth II of the United Kingdom. The Disch Promontory extends from the east side of the plateau. Baulch Peak marks the extremity of a spur descending north from the plateau.

Sherwin Peak 
Mapped by the United States Geological Survey (USGS) from Tellurometer surveys and Navy air photos, 1960-62. Named by Advisory Committee on Antarctic Names (US-ACAN) for James S. Sherwin, ionospheric scientist at Little America V, 1958.

See also
Bullseye Mountain
Canopy Cliffs
Dakota Pass
Dawson Peak
Fopay Peak
Peletier Plateau
Mount Allsup
Mount Ropar
Mount Wyman
Solitary Peak

References

Mountain ranges of the Ross Dependency
Transantarctic Mountains
Shackleton Coast